Menjalara is a major township in Kuala Lumpur, Malaysia. It is located between Kepong and Sri Damansara. Menjalara is situated adjacent to Bukit Maluri. It was named after Paduka Seri Cik Menjalara (Makche Menjalara), the mother of the first Prime Minister of Malaysia, Tunku Abdul Rahman Putra Al-Haj. It was called as Edinburgh Estate before its establishment in 1980s.

Menjalara is located adjacent to the highway Damansara–Puchong Expressway. Bandar Menjalara Community Hall is located beside the Menjalara Lake Park which are owned by Kuala Lumpur City Hall.

A ramp for the Duta–Ulu Klang Expressway are located at the intersection between Bandar Menjalara and Taman Bukit Maluri.
There is a MRT Feeder Bus Route for Bandar Menjalara T108 which is to MRT Sri Damansara Sentral to Bandar Menjalara.

Education
 SMK Menjalara
 Sekolah Menengah Agama Kuala Lumpur
 Sekolah Rendah Jenis Kebangsaan (Cina) Kepong 3
 Seri Stamford College

Facilities
 Imam Al Ghazali Mosque
 Dewan Komuniti Bandar Menjalara
 Lotus's Kepong
 Taman Tasik Menjalara

References

Suburbs in Kuala Lumpur